John Richard Blewett III (October 25, 1973 – August 16, 2007) was a NASCAR Whelen Modified Tour driver.

Career
Blewett started racing go karts at the age of 10.  In 1996, at age 22, he won the coveted NASCAR's Northeast Regional Championship, falling only a few points shy of the National Title.  During his career he recorded 97 wins between 1993 and 2007, including track championships at Flemington Speedway, Wall Township Speedway, New Egypt, as well as New Hampshire.  In 2006, he was honored during the motorsports show in Atlantic City as the northeast's Winningest Pavement Driver, for that year, as tallied by Area Auto Racing News.

Death and memorial
On August 16, 2007, while competing in a Whelen Modified race at Thompson Speedway, Blewett lost his life in a crash where he spun and was hit in the driver's door by his brother Jimmy's car. On August 18, 2007 Wall Township Speedway held a Special Memorial for John. Fans, family, and friends attended the Speedway to pay their final respects. On the final lap of the scheduled 40 lap modified event, 1990 NASCAR Whelen Modified Titlist Jamie Tomaino piloted the famed No. 76 for a solo lap in John's honor. Three months later, at the season ending Turkey Derby, the Speedway decided to reserve the No. 76 exclusively for use by the Blewett family, effectively retiring the number except that any Blewett family owned team or driver can use it, meaning any car owned by the Blewett family, or driven by brother Jimmy or his son John IV, who started racing in 2017.

The North-South Shootout, a race meet now featuring "Tour-type" Modified (similar to NASCAR Modified Tour cars, but the races are unsanctioned), SK Modified (Jack Arute owns the trademark, a Stafford Motor Speedway formula), Late Model, Super Late Model, and four-cylinder races held at various North Carolina short tracks but it is home to Caraway Speedway in Sophia,Nc, was renamed the John Blewett III Memorial North-South Shootout starting with the 2007 edition.

Previous rides
John Blewett, Inc. No. 5 – 1992–1993 (Wall Stadium)
John Blewett Inc. No. 76 – 1993–1994 (Flemington Speedway)
Lou Vasquez No. 9/No. 5 1994–1996 (New Egypt Speedway Paved)
Dick Barney No. 14 – 1995–1996, 1998–1999 (Flemington Speedway)
John Blewett, Inc. No. 05 – 1997 (Flemington Speedway)
Mario Fiore No. 44 – 1999 (Nascar Whelen Modified Tour)
Curt Chase No. 77 – 2000–2004 (Nascar Whelen Modified Tour)
Timmy Shinn No. 66 – 2002–2004 (Wall Stadium)
John Blewett, Inc No. 76 2005–2007 (Wall Stadium)
Sheba Racing No. 8 2004 (Nascar Whelen Modified Tour)
John Blewett Inc. No. 66 2005–2007 (Nascar Whelen Modified Tour)

Accomplishments
Rookie of the Year (1992)
Thanksgiving Classic (1993)
Race of Champions (1995)
NASCAR Northeast Regional (1996)
Challenge of Champions (1996, 1997)
North-South Shootout (2003, 2005)
 After his death, the race was named in his memory, the John Blewett III Memorial North-South Shootout.
Turkey Derby (2000, 2001, 2004, 2005)
 Tour-Type Modified Division
Garden State Classic (2003, 2004, 2006)

Track titles
Flemington Speedway (1996, 1997)
New Hampshire International Speedway (2000, 2002, 2003, 2006)
New Egypt Speedway (1996)
Wall Township Speedway (2006)

Motorsports career results

NASCAR
(key) (Bold – Pole position awarded by qualifying time. Italics – Pole position earned by points standings or practice time. * – Most laps led.)

Craftsman Truck Series

Featherlite Modified Series

References

External links

 Official MySpace
 Thompson Speedway Race Results
 Blewett III Profile at RaceHub

1973 births
2007 deaths
NASCAR drivers
People from Howell Township, New Jersey
Racing drivers from New Jersey
Racing drivers who died while racing
Sports deaths in Connecticut
Sportspeople from Monmouth County, New Jersey